"I Am the Highway" is a song by the American rock supergroup Audioslave, released in September 2003 as the fourth single from their eponymous 2002 debut studio album Audioslave. It reached number 66 on the Billboard Hot 100 in 2004, number 2 on the Mainstream Rock Tracks chart and number 3 on the Modern Rock Tracks chart.

The title of the song was used in the 2019 memorial concert for Chris Cornell.

Track listing
 "I Am the Highway" –

Charts

Peak positions

Footnotes

Audioslave songs
2002 songs
2003 singles
Song recordings produced by Rick Rubin
Songs written by Chris Cornell
Epic Records singles